The  is a religious administrative organisation that oversees about 80,000 Shinto shrines in Japan. These shrines take the Ise Grand Shrine as the foundation of their belief. It is the largest Shrine Shinto organization in existence.

Description 
The association has five major activities, in addition to numerous others:

Publication and dissemination of information on Shrine Shinto
The performance of rituals;
Education of adherents to Shinto;
Reverence of Ise Grand Shrine and the distribution of its amulets called Jingū taima (神宮大麻); and
Preparation and training of individuals for the Shinto priesthood.

It currently has an administrative structure including a main office and branches. Its headquarters in Yoyogi, Shibuya, Tokyo, adjacent to Meiji Shrine. The association maintains regional offices in every prefecture. They handle financial and personnel matters for member shrines.

Overview 

The Association of Shinto Shrines is the largest Shinto religious group in Japan, and more than 79,000 of the approximately 80,000 Japanese shrines, including major ones, are members. Each prefecture has a shrine office  . It is the successor to the Institute of Divinities, which was an external agency of the Home Ministry  , and is a comprehensive religious corporation based on the Religious Corporation Law .

In Article 3 of the "Regulations of the Religious Corporation 'Jinja Honcho' Agency," the regulations of the Agency as a religious corporation, the purpose of the Agency is to manage and guide shrines under its jurisdiction, promote Shinto, perform shrine rituals, educate and foster believers (Ujiko), support Ise Shrine, the head shrine, train priests, and conduct public relations through the publication and distribution of pamphlets, among other activities. The shrine is also involved in public relations activities through the publication and distribution of pamphlets.

Doctrine

Association of Shinto Shrine Charter 
The Association of Shinto Shrines is a comprehensive religious corporation of about 80,000 companies nationwide. Each shrine has its own history, and there are various religious beliefs such as Yawata belief and Inari belief, and it was very difficult to establish one doctrine. Therefore , on May 21, 1980 (Showa 55), the "Association of Shinto Shrine Charter" was established by a decision of the Councilors. The background and position of this is stated in the preamble, "The important concern to date has been to establish and maintain basic norms as a tie for spiritual integration." At the time of enforcement of this Charter, the agency rules and previous rules, etc. shall be deemed to have been established based on this Charter. "

Article 1 states, "The Association of Shinto Shrines respects tradition, promotes rituals and promotes morality, prays for the prosperity of the great lord, and contributes to the peace of the four seas."

Platform for Respectful Life 
Prior to the "Association of Shinto Shrine Charter", the "Platform of Respectful Life" was enacted in 1956 to show the practical spirit of the Association of Shinto Shrines.

There is no codified doctrine in the Association of Shinto Shrines, but according to the "Commentary on the Charter of the Association of Shinto Shrines", the Association of Shinto Shrines is the spirit of its establishment and activities with the "Association of Shinto Shrines" and the "Platform of Respectful Life".

History 
The Association was established following the Surrender of Japan at the end of World War II. On 15 December 1945, the Supreme Commander for the Allied Powers (SCAP) issued the Shinto Directive, ordering the Disestablishment of Shinto as a state religion.

In accordance with the Shinto Directive, 1946 (Showa21) January 23, National Association of Shinto Priests, the Office of Japanese Classics Research, and the Jingūkyō, took the lead to establish the Jinja Honcho.

Political links 
The Association has many contacts within the Liberal Democratic Party and is a successful lobbyist; its influence can be seen in recent conservative legislation, like the legal recognition of the National Flag (Hinomaru) and National Anthem (Kimigayo), their use for official school events, or the revision of Fundamental Education Law, and it is behind some actions by conservative politicians, like visits to Yasukuni Shrine by Junichirō Koizumi, then Prime Minister of Japan.

See also
Shinto
Kogakkan University
Ise Jingu

References

Bibliography

Sources 
This article incorporates material in 神社本庁 (Jinja Honchō) in the Japanese Wikipedia, retrieved on January 27, 2008, and May 22, 2022

External links 
 

Religious organizations established in 1946
Shinto in Japan
1946 establishments in Japan